A whisk broom or spotlight sensor, also known as an across-track scanner, is a technology for obtaining satellite images with optical cameras. It is used for passive remote sensing from space. In a whisk broom sensor, a mirror scans across the satellite’s path (ground track), reflecting light into a single detector which collects data one pixel at a time. 

The moving parts make this type of sensor expensive and more prone to wearing out, such as in the Landsat 7. Whisk broom scanners have the effect of stopping the scan, and focusing the detector on one part of the swath width. Because the detector is only focused on a subsection of the full swath at any time, it typically has a higher resolution than a push broom design for the same size of scan swath.

All sensors aboard the Landsat series of satellites used the whisk broom design until Landsat 8.

See also 
 Push broom scanner

References

External links 
 Earth Observing-1 (NASA), with animated whisk broom and push broom illustrations

Image sensors